Jeremiah Pai is a New Zealand rugby league footballer who plays for the Point Chevalier Pirates.

Early years
He was first noticed when playing for the Eastern Tornadoes in the Bartercard Cup before making his National Rugby League debut for the New Zealand Warriors in 2002.

Australia
After leaving the club he had stints with the Wests Tigers and in Parramatta and Melbourne but could not break into the first grade side. During his time with Melbourne he played for the North Sydney Bears due to a feeder agreement between the two clubs.

Return to New Zealand
He has since returned to New Zealand where he has played for the East Coast Bays Barracudas, Northcote Tigers and Hibiscus Coast Raiders and represented Auckland in both the New South Wales Cup and the Bartercard Premiership.

In 2006 Pai represented the New Zealand Māori side in a three match series against the Cook Islands.

In 2011, while playing for the Northcote Tigers, Pai won the Auckland Rugby League's Player of the Year award and was named at standoff in the Team of the Year. In 2012 Pai moved clubs, joining the Point Chevalier Pirates.

He was named in the New Zealand Māori squad in 2015 to play Auckland.

References

1982 births
Living people
New Zealand rugby league players
Auckland rugby league team players
New Zealand Warriors players
East Coast Bays Barracudas players
North Sydney Bears NSW Cup players
Hibiscus Coast Raiders players
North Harbour rugby league team players
Northcote Tigers players
Eastern Tornadoes players
New Zealand Māori rugby league players
New Zealand Māori rugby league team players
Rugby league five-eighths
Point Chevalier Pirates players